The Blue Mauritius is a 1918 German silent film directed by Viggo Larsen and starring Harry Liedtke and Käthe Dorsch.

Cast

References

Bibliography

External links

1918 films
Films directed by Viggo Larsen
German silent feature films
Films of the German Empire
German black-and-white films
1910s German films